Percy Barratt (6 October 1898–1974) was an English footballer who played in the Football League for Nottingham Forest.

References

1898 births
1974 deaths
English footballers
Association football defenders
English Football League players
Nottingham Forest F.C. players
Grantham Town F.C. players